Fabric 26 is a DJ mix compilation album by Global Communication, as part of the Fabric Mix Series.

Track listing
  The Return Of The Returner - Intro - Mark Pritchard
  Dabrye - No Child Of God (Instrumental) - Eastern Developments Music
  Wajeed - Starz - Bling 47 Recordings
  Tableek - Serene Vision - Four Brothers INK / Bukarance Records
  Steve Spacek - I'm Glad - Sound In Color
  Harmonic 313 - Arc Light - Harmonic 313
  Maspyke - Lightly Anxious - ABB / Bukarance Records
  Danny Breaks - The Octopus (Intergalactic Starighter) - The Alphabet Zoo Record Company
  MED Ft. Dudley Perkins - Now U Know - Stones Throw Records
  Trickski - Sunshine Fu*k Part 1 - Sonar Kollektiv
  Genre - Too - NEPA Recordings
  Jeremy Ellis - 86 (Verbs) - Ubiquity Recordings
  Kirk Degiorgio Presents As One - Rumours - Versatile Records
  Motorcitysoul - Aura - Infracom
  Scott Groove - Flookin' - Loungin' Recordings
  Audiomontage - Vision 2 Vision - Freerange Records
  Vince Watson - The Way It's Meant To Be - Delsin Records
  Shur-I-Kan - Living Inside - Freerange Records
  Soul Mekanik - Robots - Rip Records
  Artec - Sweet Music - Lucid Recordings
  Balil - Flux - Warp Records
  Tom Middleton Presents AMBA - Margherita - Tomidi Productions

References

External links
Fabric: Fabric 26

Fabric (club) albums
2006 compilation albums